Denzil Thompson is a former international footballer and the current manager of the Guyana national football team.

He played as a goalkeeper. Thompson was involved in the 1982 FIFA World Cup qualification campaign for Guyana playing in two games against Suriname.

In August 2014, he was appointed as coach of the Guyana national football team. He took control of the national team for the 2014 Caribbean Cup qualification campaign.

References 

Living people
Guyanese footballers
Guyana international footballers
Guyanese football managers
Guyana national football team managers
Year of birth missing (living people)
Place of birth missing (living people)
Association football goalkeepers
Afro-Guyanese people